Steven Kenneth Maidlow (born June 6, 1960 in Lansing, Michigan) is a former American football linebacker in the National Football League for the Cincinnati Bengals and the Buffalo Bills.  He played college football at Michigan State University (1978–82) where he was a three-year starter and a two-year All-Big Ten honoree.  He was selected in the fourth round (109th overall) of the 1983 NFL Draft by the Bengals.  Maidlow resides in Cincinnati, Ohio with his wife Karen.

References

1960 births
Living people
Sportspeople from Lansing, Michigan
American football linebackers
Michigan State Spartans football players
Cincinnati Bengals players
Buffalo Bills players
Players of American football from Michigan